Balabani may refer to:

Balabani, in Boteni, Argeș County, Romania
Balabani, in Mociu, Cluj County, Romania
Balabani, in Conţeşti, Dâmboviţa County, Romania
Balabani, in Sineşti, Ialomiţa County, Romania
Balabani, Montenegro